SWANA, as an acronym or initialism, may refer to:

 Solid Waste Association of North America, a professional association based in the United States
 South West Asia and North Africa, a less Eurocentric term for the supranational region including North Africa and a varying number of territories in West or Southwest Asia